Tindirma  is a village and commune of the Cercle of Diré in the Tombouctou Region of Mali. As of 1998 the commune had a population of 3,419.

History
Established in 1496, Tindirma was once a Jewish community founded by Iberian Sephardi Jews who had been expelled from Spain and Portugal. Jewish graves and structures still remain in Tindirma. In 1963, the ethnic consciousness of Jewish descendants living in Tindirma was revived after local fishermen wanted to built a village on top of the remains of Al Yahudi Cemetery, causing local Jews to rise up in strong opposition.

See also
Jews of Bilad el-Sudan

References

1496 establishments
Communes of Tombouctou Region
Historic Jewish communities in West Africa
Jews and Judaism in Mali
Portuguese-Jewish diaspora in Africa
Sephardi Jewish culture in Africa
Spanish diaspora in Africa
Spanish-Jewish diaspora